The Halle Opera House is an opera house in Halle, Saxony-Anhalt. Originally named the Halle Town Theatre , the theatre was built in 1886. A bomb attack on 31 March 1945 destroyed much of the original building. Restorative work ensued a few years later, and the theatre reopened in 1951 under the name Landestheater Halle. In January 1992 it was renamed to its current title. The theatre is currently used for performances of opera, ballet, and orchestral concerts. It is also the main performance venue for the annual summer Handel Festival held in the city.

References

External links
 

 

Music venues completed in 1886
Buildings and structures in Halle (Saale)
Opera houses in Germany
Ballet venues
Theatres completed in 1886
1886 establishments in Germany